Carry On Oi! is a 1981 Oi! compilation album, featuring various artists and released by Secret Records. Also known as Oi 3!, it was compiled by Garry Bushell.

The album was the sequel to Oi! The Album (1980) and Strength Thru Oi! (1981), and was itself followed by Oi! Oi! That's Yer Lot! (1982).

Track listing
 "United" - Garry Johnson
 "Dambusters March" - JJ All Stars
 "Suburban Rebels" - The Business
 "Each Dawn I Die" - Infa-Riot
 "Arms Race" - The Partisans
 "East End Kids" - The Ejected
 "Transvestite" - Peter and the Test Tube Babies
 "Nation on Fire" - Blitz
 "King of the Jungle" - The Last Resort 
 "Tuckers Ruckers Ain't No Suckers" - The Gonads
 "Evil" - 4 Skins
 "Product" - The Business
 "SPG" - Red Alert
 "Guvnor's Man" - Oi The Comrade
 "Maniac" - Peter and the Test Tube Babies
 "What Am I Gonna Do" - The Ejected
 "No U Turns" - The Partisans
 "Youth" - Blitz
 "Walk On" - Oi The Choir

See also
Oi! The Album
Oi! Oi! That's Yer Lot!
Strength Thru Oi!
Son of Oi!

1981 compilation albums
Punk rock compilation albums
Oi! albums